Eclipse is the first studio album by the industrial techno band G.G.F.H. All the tracks on this release have been recorded before on the band's seventh demo, also entitled Eclipse, albeit in rougher or slightly different mixes.  The tracks Eclipse, In My Room and Skalpel are only available on the CD.  Nothing Left Inside is an industrialised cover version of a track by American punk/hardcore band Black Flag.

Track listing

LP
Side One
 "Fiending Korpse" – 3:52
 "Forgiven" – 3:56
 "Enter The Shadow" – 5:43
 "Dead Inside" – 3:11
 "Sister Cathleen" – 3:27
 "Forever Is Forever" – 2:24

Side Two
 "Scapegoat" – 5:28
 "Secret Friend" – 3:20
 "Nothing Left Inside" – 4:10
 "Cookie Monster" – 2:49
 "One Color Red" – 3:34

CD
All Lyrics By Ghost; All Music By G.G.F.H., except where noted. 
 "Fiending Korpse" – 3:52
 "Forgiven" – 3:56
 "Enter The Shadow" – 5:43
 "Dead Inside" – 3:11
 "Eclipse" – 3:14+
 "Sister Cathleen" – 3:27 (Lyrics: Brian J. Walls; Music: G.G.F.H.)
 "Forever Is Forever" – 2:24
 "Scapegoat" – 5:28
 "Secret Friend" – 3:20
 "In My Room" – 7:31+
 "Skalpel" – 3:53+
 "Nothing Left Inside" – 4:10 (Lyrics & Music: Black Flag)
 "Cookie Monster" – 2:49
 "One Color Red" – 3:34

+ Extra tracks on CD only

Personnel
Ghost (aka Michael Geist)  - vocals, electronics, sampling, vocal treatments, programming
Brian J. Walls - guitar, synthesizer programming, electronics, vocal treatments
With "Erika": Additional vocals on track 8

Production
Arranged & Produced By G.G.F.H.
Engineered By Brian J. Walls
Mixed By Brian J. Walls & Dan "Wrathbone" Rathbun at Polymorph Productions
Mastered By Steve Lindsley at Live Oak

1991 debut albums
G.G.F.H. albums
Peaceville Records albums